The FIS Alpine World Ski Championships 1970 were held 8–15 February in Gröden/Val Gardena, Italy.

For the only time, results from a World Championships were included in the World Cup points standings, then in its fourth season. Two seasons earlier, results from the Winter Olympics (concurrent World Championships) were also included in the World Cup standings.

The French team again led with ten medals: three gold, five silver, and two bronze.

Men's competitions

Downhill

Sunday, 15 February

Giant Slalom
Monday,9 February (run 1)
Tuesday, 10 February (run 2)
Schranz led after the first run at 2:15.15; Bleiner was next, 0.30 seconds back.

Slalom
Sunday, 8 February

Combined
At the World Championships from 1954 through 1980, the combined was a "paper race" using the results of the three events (DH, GS, SL).

Women's competitions

Downhill
Wednesday, 11 February

Giant Slalom
Saturday, 14 February

Slalom
Friday, 13 February

Combined
At the World Championships from 1954 through 1980, the combined was a "paper race" using the results of the three events (DH, GS, SL).

Medals table

References

External links
FIS-ski.com – results – 1970 World Championships – Val Gardena, Italy 
FIS-ski.com – results – World Championships

FIS Alpine World Ski Championships
1970
A
1970 in Italian sport
Alpine skiing competitions in Italy
February 1970 sports events in Europe